Choi Jung-won (born August 16, 1995) is a South Korean football player. He plays for K League 2 club Jeonnam Dragons.

References

External links

1995 births
Living people
South Korean footballers
J2 League players
Fagiano Okayama players
Association football defenders